is a 2014 rhythm game created by Sega and Crypton Future Media for the PlayStation Vita and PlayStation 3, and is the direct sequel to Hatsune Miku: Project DIVA F. The Vita version of the game is compatible with the PlayStation Vita TV system. The game was released in Japan on March 27, 2014, in North America on November 18, and in Europe on November 21 in the same year.

Development
The game was publicly announced on 9 July 2013 in a preview for the July 25th issue of Enterbrain's Famitsu magazine. It was reported that at the time of the announcement, development of the game was 39% complete.

The character modules are designed by Kuushin, Nezuki, and Sakura/Alice. The full original cast from the previous game is set to be present in Project Diva F 2nd.

An initial preview playable demo for the PlayStation Vita featuring three songs was made available from 17–23 October 2013. A second demo was released on the Japanese PlayStation Network following the game's release.

Costume module, UI skin and rhythm game song DLC content was scheduled to be released every two weeks for a six-month period for both Japanese and Western regions. DLC began rolling out on December 9, 2014 for North America and Europe, and players within these regions were able to purchase DLC season passes.

Gameplay

The game is set to have a similar play style to its predecessor, Hatsune Miku: Project DIVA F, whilst featuring new songs, returning songs from previous games, and character modules. New in-game mechanisms original to the game include sliding touchscreen notes, and double scratch notes. The DIVA room also features various minigames that can be played, including a clapping game. Another new addition to Project DIVA F 2nd over the previous game is the ability to change skins for the rhythm game mode, where decorative skin designs can be downloaded as DLC. The game features cross-save support between PS Vita and PS3 systems. The game tutorial, featuring "Ievan Polkka" just like the previous game, now also includes an extreme mode for advanced players in addition to the standard tutorial for beginners.

When played on a PS Vita TV device, the rhythm game features will be available, however AR features relying on the handheld PS Vita's camera will not be accessible. The DualShock 3 controls will be identical to the PS3 version, and a timing adjustment function will be available to take into account of television display lag, just like with the PS3 version.

Reception
The game was given a review score of 37/40 by Famitsu for the PS Vita version, and 36/40 for the PS3 version. PlayStation LifeStyle awarded the Vita version 7/10 and praised the familiar rhythmic gameplay, though said that the new songs were not as strong as the franchise's past offerings. Hardcore Gamer gave the game a 4/5, saying "At its core it may simply be more of the same tight, frantic rhythm gameplay found in its predecessor, but with intelligent additions and a robust track list, Project Diva F 2nd is an easy recommendation for returning fans and anyone looking for a concentrated dose of J-pop flair."

During the first week of release in Japan, the PS Vita version of the game sold 98,628 physical retail copies, ranking first place amongst all software sales in Japan within that week, whilst the PS3 version sold 59,965 physical retail copies, taking third place.

Song list
A total of 42 playable songs are available in the game, in addition to another set of songs exclusively for AR Mode on the Vita and Live Studio on the PS3, and additional downloadable content released following the initial game release. Individual songs appearing within the game are listed below.

Songs with no background are new songs first introduced in Project DIVA F 2nd.
Songs with a light-blue background are returning songs from earlier Project DIVA games with remastered PVs that features a new Chance Time sequence, with the exception of Ievan Polkka in the Tutorial Mode.
Songs with a green background are returning songs from earlier Project DIVA games with new PVs.
Songs with an orange background are playable DLC songs, and must be purchased on the PlayStation Network.
Songs with a yellow background are songs only available in AR Live Mode or Live Stage Mode, all based on Magical Mirai 2013 (マジカルミライ2013) at Yokohama Arena, held on August 30, 2013.

Notes

References

External links
 
 
 

2014 video games
Hatsune Miku: Project DIVA games
Music video games
PlayStation 3 games
PlayStation Vita games
Sega video games
Creative works using vocaloids
Video games developed in Japan